Dae-won, also spelled Dai-won or Tae-won, is a Korean masculine given name. Its meaning depends on the hanja used to write each syllable of the name.

Hanja
There are 17 hanja with the reading "dae" and 35 hanja with the reading "won" on the South Korean government's official list of hanja which may be registered for use in given names. Ways of writing this name in hanja include:

 (클 대 keul dae, 으뜸 원 euddeum won): "great origin". These same characters are also used to write the Japanese names Oomoto, Masamoto, and Hiromoto.
 (클 대 keul dae, 근원 원): "great spring".

People
Daewon (born Moon Jae-hyeon, 1936), South Korean Zen master
Han Dayuan (Korean name Han Dae-won, born 1960), Chinese law professor of Korean descent
Dai-won Moon (born 1968), South Korean-born Mexican taekwondo master
Kim C (born Kim Dae-won, 1971), South Korean singer
Daewon Song (born 1975), South Korean-born American skateboarder
Im Dae-won (born 1976), South Korean Greco-Roman wrestler
Ha Dae-won (born 1985), South Korean football player
Bae Dae-won (born 1988), South Korean football player
Tochinowaka Michihiro (born Lee Dae-won, 1988), Japanese sumo wrestler of Korean descent
Kim Dae-won (footballer, born 1992), South Korean football midfielder
Kim Dae-won (footballer, born 1997), South Korean football forward
Park Dae-won (born 1998), South Korean football defender

See also
List of Korean given names

References

Korean masculine given names